The 2017 Euro Beach Soccer League (EBSL) was the 20th edition of the annual, premier European competition in beach soccer contested between men's national teams, in a league and play-off format.

This season teams continued to take part in two divisions, the top tier (Division A) and the bottom tier (Division B). Twelve teams continued to contest Division A as in recent seasons, consisting of the top eleven finishers from last year plus Azerbaijan who were promoted to the top tier. Division B was expanded to accommodate fifteen nations; the thirteen nations which did not gain promotion from last season, Lithuania who made their debut, plus Romania who were relegated from the top tier. No nations returned to the tournament after an absence from competing in recent years.

This season, in recognition of the 20th anniversary of the competition, additional matches were scheduled for a total of five stages of fixtures during the regular season. Each team from Division A played in two stages whilst each team from Division B played in one stage. During each stage the participating nations earned points for the overall league tables.

At the end of the regular season stages, according to the league tables, the eight best teams in Division A advanced to the post-season Superfinal to compete directly to become the winners of this year's EBSL. Meanwhile, the top seven teams in Division B (the stage winners and best runners-up) and the team ranked bottom of Division A played in the Promotion Final to try to earn a spot in Division A next year.

Turkey were promoted to Division A after beating Estonia to claim the Promotion Final title. This sees Turkey return to the top flight for the first time since they were relegated from Division A in 2011. Greece finished last in Division A and failed to defend their place in the Promotion Final and were therefore subsequently relegated to Division B, ending their four-year run in the top tier.

Russia won the league after a strong performance in the Superfinal, claiming their fifth EBSL crown to tie for first with Spain and Portugal with the most titles in EBSL history. Defending champions Ukraine were knocked out of title-winning contention in the group stage of the Superfinal, ultimately finishing seventh in the post-season event.

Calendar and locations

Teams

The following teams have entered this season, in the following divisions (12 in Division A, 15 in Division B).

The numbers in brackets show the European ranking of each team prior to the start of the season, out of 36 nations.

Division A

  (1st)
  (2nd)
  (3rd)
  (4th)
  (5th)
  (6th)
  (7th)
  (9th)
  (11th)
  (12th)
 1 (14th)
  (15th)

Division B

  (8th)
  (10th)
  (13th)
  (16th)
 2 (17th)
  (18th)
  (19th)
  (20th)
  (21st)
  (22nd)
  (24th)
  (25th)
  (26th)
  (27th)
 3 (28th)

Notes:
1. Promoted from Division B at the end of the 2016 season
2. Relegated from Division A at the end of the 2016 season
3. Teams making their debut

Stage 1 (Belgrade, 23–25 June) 
Matches are listed as local time in Belgrade, CEST (UTC+2)

All matches took place at the National Beach Soccer Stadium at Ada Ciganlija, with a capacity of 2,500.

Division A

Division B

Serbia, Norway and Czech Republic are ranked accordingly based on their three-way head-to-head results

Awards
The following were presented after the conclusion of final day's matches. Individual awards apply to Division A only.

Stage 2 (Nazaré, 7–9 July) 
Stage 2 was originally scheduled to take place in Sanxenxo, Spain but on 1 June, BSWW announced the stage was to be moved due to administrative issues, with Nazaré becoming the new host city due to having successfully hosted the 2017 Euro Winners Cup events, as well as being in close geographical proximity to the original hosts, Sanxenxo.

There were no Division B fixtures during this stage.

Division A 
Matches are listed as local time in Nazaré, WEST (UTC+1)

All matches took place at the Estádio do Viveiro at the Praia de Nazaré, in tandem with the hosting of the 2017 Women's Euro Beach Soccer Cup. The arena has a capacity of 1,600.

Group 1

Group 2

Awards
The following were presented after the conclusion of the final day's matches.

Stage 3 (Moscow, 28–30 July) 
Matches are listed as local time in Moscow, MSK (UTC+3)

All matches took place at Yantar Beach Soccer Stadium in the district of Strogino, with a capacity of 2,500 seats.

Division A

Division B

Awards
The following were presented after the conclusion of final day's matches. Individual awards apply to Division A only.

Stage 4 (Siófok, 11–13 August) 
Matches are listed as local time in Siófok, CEST (UTC+2)

All matches took place at the Mlsz Beach Aréna at Nagystrand, with a capacity of 1,500.

Division A

Division B

Awards
The following were presented after the conclusion of final day's matches. Individual awards apply to Division A only.

Stage 5 (Warnemünde, 25–27 August) 
Matches are listed as local time in Warnemünde, CEST (UTC+2)

All matches took place at the purpose built DFB Beachsoccer Arena, at the site of the Sport & Beach Arena on Warnemünde Beach, with a capacity of 1,500 seats.

Division A

Division B

Awards
The following were presented after the conclusion of final day's matches. Individual awards apply to Division A only.

League tables

At stage completion

Ranking & tie-breaking criteria: Division A – 1. Points earned 2. Goal difference 3. Goals scored | Division B – 1. Highest group placement 2. Points earned 3. Goal difference 4. Goals scored 5. Results against 4th place team

Division A

Division B

Note: Since one group in Division B consisted of just three teams, for the teams who finished in 1st, 2nd or 3rd in a group of four, their results against the 4th placed team in their groups have been discounted.
Team group placement:  1st place /  2nd place /  3rd place /  4th place

(Q) – Qualified to Promotion Final as group winner(q) – Qualified Promotion Final as best group runners-up

Promotion Final (Terracina, 14–17 September)

Qualified teams
The teams in bold have qualified as group winners. The team in italics will attempt to retain their position in Division A, having finished bottom of the table.

 
 
 
 (Last place, Division A)

Group stage
Matches are listed as local time in Terracina, CEST (UTC+2)

All matches took place at the Beach Arena "Carlo Guarnieri", at Spiaggia di Levante with a capacity of around 2,500.

Group 1

Group 2

Play-off stage

Seventh place play-off

Fifth place play-off

Third place play-off

Promotion play-off final

Final standings

Italics: team from Division A

Superfinal (Terracina, 14–17 September)

Qualified teams
The top eight teams from Division A, as per the league table, qualified for the Superfinal.

Group stage
Matches are listed as local time in Terracina, CEST (UTC+2)

All matches took place at the Beach Arena "Carlo Guarnieri", at Spiaggia di Levante with a capacity of around 2,500.

Group 1

Group 2

Play-off stage

Seventh place play-off

Fifth place play-off

Third place play-off

Superfinal match

Awards

Winners trophy

Individual awards
Awarded for feats achieved in the Superfinal only

Final standings

Season statistics

Top scorers
The following tables list the top 10 scorers in each division including goals scored in both the regular and post season events. Note there is no award presented for these season-encompassing scoring feats, the tables are for statistical purposes only. Scoring awards were bestowed per stage, with the primary award that which was presented in the Superfinal.

Division A

Division B

Assists
The following tables list the top five assistants in each division including assists provided in both the regular and post season events.

Division A

Division B

Source

Note: The source of these assists stats does not explain what system was used to determine the award of an assist. The total no. of assists recorded is 270 but 727 goals were scored. The discrepancy of the source not recording an assist for every goal scored may be due to a system in use such as FIFAs assists system - (regardless of who made the final pass to the scorer, no assist is awarded when the scorer ultimately lays the goal on for him/herself via a dribble, solo run etc, scores after intercepting an opponent's pass etc.). However since the system in use is not explained, note that assists may simply of gone undocumented.

Discipline
The following table lists the players and teams who received the most penalties for disciplinary infringements in each division in both the regular and post season events.

Source

References

External links
 Beach Soccer Worldwide (organisers' official website)
 Announcement & format

 Stage 1, Belgrade
 Stage 2, Nazaré 
 Stage 3, Moscow
 Stage 4, Siófok
 Stage 5, Warnemünde
 Superfinal

Euro Beach Soccer League
2017 in beach soccer
2017 in Serbian sport
2017 in Portuguese sport
2017 in Russian sport
2017 in Hungarian sport
2017 in German sport
2017 in Italian sport